Jayda  is a feminine given name, a derivative of Jade via Jada or a feminine form of Jayden. Notable people named Jayda include:

Jayda Fransen, British political activist
Jayda Hylton-Pelaia, Canadian-Jamaican footballer
Jayda (singer), Filipino singer-songwriter

References

Feminine given names
English feminine given names